The Constitution of Japan (Shinjitai: , Kyūjitai: ,) is the constitution of Japan and the supreme law in the state. Written primarily by American civilian officials working under the Allied occupation of Japan, the constitution replaced the Meiji Constitution of 1890 when it came into effect on 3 May 1947.

The constitution provides for a parliamentary system of government and guarantees certain fundamental rights. In contrast to the Meiji Constitution, which invested the Emperor of Japan with supreme political power, under the new charter the Emperor was reduced to "the symbol of the State and of the unity of the people" and exercises only a ceremonial role acting under the sovereignty of the people.

Japanese scholars reviewed and modified it before adoption. It changed Japan's previous system of semi-constitutional monarchy and stratocracy with a parliamentary monarchy. The Constitution is best known for Article 9, by which Japan renounces its right to wage war and maintain military forces.

The Japanese constitution is the oldest unamended constitution in the world. It has not had any amendments to its text in more than 70 years. It is a short constitution with only 5,000 words, compared to the average constitution with 21,000 words.

Historical origins

Meiji Constitution 
The Meiji Constitution was the fundamental law of the Empire of Japan, propagated during the reign of Emperor Meiji. It provided for a form of mixed constitutional and absolute monarchy, based on the Prussian and British models. In theory, the Emperor of Japan was the supreme leader, and the cabinet, whose prime minister was elected by a privy council, were his followers; in practice, the Emperor was head of state but the Prime Minister was the actual head of government. Under the Meiji Constitution, the prime minister and his cabinet were not accountable to the elected members of the Diet, and increasingly deferred to the Imperial Japanese Army in the lead-up to the Second Sino-Japanese War.

The Potsdam Declaration 
On 26 July 1945, shortly before the end of the Second World War, Allied leaders of the United States, the United Kingdom, and the Republic of China issued the Potsdam Declaration. The Declaration demanded Japan's unconditional surrender, demilitarisation and democratisation.

The declaration defined the major goals of the post-surrender Allied occupation: "The Japanese Government shall remove all obstacles to the revival and strengthening of democratic tendencies among the Japanese people. Freedom of speech, of religion, and of thought, as well as respect for the fundamental human rights shall be established" (Section 10). In addition, "The occupying forces of the Allies shall be withdrawn from Japan as soon as these objectives have been accomplished and there has been established in accordance with the freely expressed will of the Japanese people a peacefully inclined and responsible government" (Section 12). The Allies sought not merely punishment or reparations from a militaristic foe, but fundamental changes in the nature of its political system. In the words of a political scientist Robert E. Ward: "The occupation was perhaps the single most exhaustively planned operation of massive and externally directed political change in world history."

The Japanese government accepted the conditions of the Potsdam Declaration, which necessitates amendments to its Constitution after the surrender.

Drafting process 

The wording of the Potsdam Declaration—"The Japanese Government shall remove all obstacles ..."—and the initial post-surrender measures taken by MacArthur, suggest that neither he nor his superiors in Washington intended to impose a new political system on Japan unilaterally. Instead, they wished to encourage Japan's new leaders to initiate democratic reforms on their own. But by early 1946, MacArthur's staff and Japanese officials were at odds over the most fundamental issue, the writing of a new Constitution. Emperor Hirohito, Prime Minister Kijūrō Shidehara, and most of the cabinet members were extremely reluctant to take the drastic step of replacing the 1889 Meiji Constitution with a more liberal document. 

Konoe Fumimaro, Shidehara Cabinet and the civil constitutional study groups formed original constitutions. The formal draft constitution which was created by the Shidehara Cabinet was rejected by GHQ and the government reviewed the revised drafts by various political parties and accepted liberal ways of thinking especially toward the emperor as the symbol of nationals and dispossession of a military power.

After World War II, the Allied Powers concluded an "Instrument of Surrender" with Japan, which stated that "the Emperor and the Government of Japan shall come under the subordination of the Supreme Commander of the Allied Powers”. Koseki interprets this statement as the GHQ's indirect rule through the Emperor and the Japanese government, rather than direct rule over the Japanese people. In other words, GHQ regarded the Emperor Hirohito not as a war criminal parallel to Hitler and Mussolini but as one governance mechanism.

The Japanese government at the end of World War II was organized by the cabinet of Prince Higashikuninomiya, with Fumimaro Konoe, who had served as the prime minister during the Manchurian Incident in 1931, as a minister without portfolio. The trigger of constitutional amendment was from GHQ General MacArthur's word to Fumimaro Konoe. After an unsuccessful first visit on September 13, 1945, Fumimaro Konoe paid another visit to MacArthur at the GHQ headquarters on October 4, 1945. Although the GHQ later denied this fact, citing a mistake by the Japanese interpreter, diplomatic documents between Japan and the U.S. state that "the Constitution must be amended to fully incorporate liberal elements". "At the meeting, the General told Konoe that the Constitution must be amended". In this regard, it can be said that the GHQ granted Konoe the authority to amend the Constitution. However, at this point, the Higashikuninomiya Cabinet was succeeded by the Shidehara Cabinet, and Joji Matsumoto, the then Minister of State, stated that the Cabinet should be the only one to amend the Constitution, and the Constitutional Problems Investigation Committee was established. In other words, there was a conflict between the Konoe and Shidehara cabinets as to who should take the initiative in constitutional amendment.

However, this conflict ended with Konoe being nominated as a candidate for Class A war criminal due to domestic and international criticism. To begin with, Konoe was able to have the initiative to amend the Constitution because he had been assigned full-time by the GHQ to amend the constitution, although he was not an unappointed minister when the cabinet was changed. However, due to domestic and foreign criticism of Konoe, the GHQ announced on November 1 that Konoe had not been appointed to amend the Constitution and that he had no authority to lead the amendment of the constitution since the cabinet had changed. At that time, Konoe belonged to the Office of the Minister of the Interior, which was in charge of politics related to the Imperial Household, but since the Office of the Minister of the Interior was about to be abolished, he decided to submit a proposal for amendment before then. Konoe's proposal reflected the wishes of the GHQ and was very liberal in content, including "limitation of the royal prerogative," "independent dissolution of the Diet," and "freedom of speech," but it was never finally approved as a draft, and Konoe committed suicide by poisoning himself. After this, the authority to amend the Constitution was completely transferred to Shidehara's cabinet.

In late 1945, Shidehara appointed Jōji Matsumoto, state minister without portfolio, head of a blue-ribbon committee of Constitutional scholars to suggest revisions. The Matsumoto Committee was composed of the authorities of the Japanese law academia, including Tatsuki Minobe (美濃部達吉), and the first general meeting was held on October 27, 1945. Joji Matsumoto presented the following four principles of constitutional amendment to the Budget Committee of the House of Representatives in 1945.Four principles of constitutional amendment

1. Do not change the basic principle of the Constitution of the Empire of Japan that the Emperor has total control.

2. To expand the power of the parliament and, as a reflection, limit the matters related to the Emperor's power to some extent.

3. Put the responsibility of the Minister of State on all national affairs, and the Minister of State shall be responsible to the Parliament.

4. Expand the protection of people's freedoms and rights and take adequate relief measures.

The Matsumoto Committee has prepared a constitutional amendment outline based on these principles.

The Matsumoto Commission's recommendations (:ja:松本試案), made public in February 1946, were quite conservative as "no more than a touching-up of the Meiji Constitution". MacArthur rejected them outright and ordered his staff to draft a completely new document. An additional reason for this was that on 24 January 1946, Prime Minister Shidehara had suggested to MacArthur that the new Constitution should contain an article renouncing war.

As the momentum for constitutional amendment increased, interest in the constitution increased among the people. In fact, not only political parties but also private organizations have announced draft constitutional amendments.

The most famous of these is the outline of the draft constitution by the Constitution Study Group. The Constitutional Study Group was established on October 29, 1945 to study and prepare for the establishment of the Constitution from a leftist approach. While many political party drafts only added to the Meiji Constitution, their drafts included the principle of popular sovereignty, which grants sovereignty to the people and regards the Emperor as a symbol of the people. The Constitutional Study Group submitted a draft to the Prime Minister's Office on December 26, 1945. On January 2, 1946, GHQ issued a statement that it would focus on the content. Toyoharu Konishi states that the GHQ may have included the opinion of the Constitutional Study Group in the draft, reflecting the situation in the United States, where people disregarded popular sovereignty at that time. Also, regarding the symbolic emperor system, since the members of the Constitutional Study Group came into contact with the GHQ dignitaries earlier than the drafting of the guidelines, the Constitutional Study Group proposed the symbolic emperor system through the GHQ dignitaries. It is analyzed that it was reflected in the GHQ proposal.

The Constitution was mostly drafted by American authors. A few Japanese scholars reviewed and modified it. Much of the drafting was done by two senior army officers with law degrees: Milo Rowell and Courtney Whitney, although others chosen by MacArthur had a large say in the document. The articles about equality between men and women were written by Beate Sirota.

MacArthur gave the authors less than a week to complete the draft, which was presented to surprised Japanese officials on 13 February 1946. MacArthur initially had a policy of not interfering with the revision of the Constitution, but from around January 1946, he made a statement to the Constitutional Draft Outline of the Constitutional Study Group and activated movements related to the Constitution. There are various theories as to the reason. Kenzo Yanagi mentioned the memorandum of Courtney Whitney, who was the director of the Civil Affairs Bureau of the General Headquarters, on February 1, 1946 as a reason for the attitude change. In the memorandum, it is mentioned that the Far Eastern Commission was about to be established. The Far Eastern Commission is the supreme policy-making body established by the United States, Great Britain, the Soviet Union, China, Australia and other allies to occupy and control Japan, and its authority was higher than that of GHQ. MacArthur learned that the Far Eastern Commission was interested in constitutional amendment, and thought that constitutional authority could be transferred to the Far Eastern Commission after the commission was established. Therefore, he might be eager to end the constitutional issue with unlimited authority before it was founded.

On February 18, the Japanese government called on the GHQ to reconsider the MacArthur Draft, which is significantly different from the Matsumoto Draft, but Whitney rejected the proposal on February 20. On the contrary, he asked the Japanese government for a reply within 48 hours. Then, Prime Minister Shidehara met with MacArthur on February 21 and decided to accept the MacArthur draft by a cabinet meeting on the following day.

After the Cabinet decision, Joji Matsumoto aimed to draft a Japanese government bill based on the MacArthur Draft, and the draft was completed on March 2 of the same year.

On March 4 Joji Matsumoto presented the draft to Whitney, but GHQ noticed that there were differences between the MacArthur Draft and the March 2 Draft. In particular, the March 2 Draft did not include a preamble, and a heated argument ensued. Finally, adjustments were made by the Japanese government and GHQ, and the draft was completed on March 6.

On 6 March 1946, the government publicly disclosed an outline of the pending Constitution. On 10 April, elections were held for the House of Representatives of the Ninetieth Imperial Diet, which would consider the proposed Constitution. The election law having been changed, this was the first general election in Japan in which women were permitted to vote.

In the process of passing through the House of Representatives in August 1946, the draft of the Constitutional Amendment was modified. This is called the Ashida Amendment, since the chairman of the committee at the time was Hitoshi Ashida. In particular, Article 9, which refers to the renunciation of armed forces, was controversial. 

The phrase "In order to accomplish the aim of the preceding paragraph," was added to paragraph 2 by Hitoshi Ashida without the diet deliberations. Although the reason is not clear, this addition has led to the interpretation of the Constitution as allowing the retention of force when factors other than the purpose of the preceding paragraph arise. Even now there is a great debate over whether force for self-defense, such as the Self Defense Forces, is a violation of the Constitution.

Article 9.1)    Aspiring sincerely to an international peace based on justice and order, the Japanese people forever renounce war as a sovereign right of the nation and the threat or use of force as means of settling international disputes.

2)   In order to accomplish the aim of the preceding paragraph, land, sea, and air forces, as well as other war potential, will never be maintained. The right of belligerency of the state will not be recognized.

Unlike most previous Japanese legal documents, the constitution is written in modern colloquial Japanese instead of Classical Japanese. The Japanese version includes some awkward phrasing and scholars sometimes consult the English drafts to resolve ambiguities.

The MacArthur draft, which proposed a unicameral legislature, was changed at the insistence of the Japanese to allow a bicameral one, with both houses being elected. In most other important respects, the government adopted the ideas embodied in the 13 February document in its own draft proposal of 6 March. These included the constitution's most distinctive features: the symbolic role of the Emperor, the prominence of guarantees of civil and human rights, and the renunciation of war. The constitution followed closely a 'model copy' prepared by MacArthur's command.

In 1946, criticism of or reference to MacArthur's role in drafting the constitution could be made subject to Civil Censorship Detachment (CCD) censorship (as was any reference to censorship itself). Until late 1947, CCD exerted pre-publication censorship over about 70 daily newspapers, all books, and magazines, and many other publications.

Adoption 

It was decided that in adopting the new document the Meiji Constitution would not be violated. Rather, to maintain legal continuity, the new Constitution was adopted as an amendment to the Meiji Constitution in accordance with the provisions of Article 73 of that document. Under Article 73 the new constitution was formally submitted to the Imperial Diet, which was elected by universal suffrage, which was granted also women, in 1946, by the Emperor through an imperial rescript issued on 20 June. The draft constitution was submitted and deliberated upon as the Bill for Revision of the Imperial Constitution.

The old constitution required that the bill receive the support of a two-thirds majority in both houses of the Diet to become law. Both chambers had made amendments. Without interference by MacArthur, House of Representatives added Article 17, which guarantees the right to sue the State for the tort of officials, Article 40, which guarantees the right to sue the State for wrongful detention, and Article 25, which guarantees the right to life. The house also amended Article 9. And the House of Peers approved the document on 6 October; the House of Representatives adopted it in the same form the following day, with only five members voting against. It became law when it received the Emperor's assent on 3 November 1946. Under its own terms, the constitution came into effect on 3 May 1947.

A government organisation, the Kenpō Fukyū Kai ("Constitution Popularisation Society"), was established to promote the acceptance of the new constitution among the populace.

Early proposals for amendment 

The new constitution would not have been written the way it was had MacArthur and his staff allowed Japanese politicians and constitutional experts to resolve the issue as they wished. The document's foreign origins have, understandably, been a focus of controversy since Japan recovered its sovereignty in 1952. Yet in late 1945 and 1946, there was much public discussion on constitutional reform, and the MacArthur draft was apparently greatly influenced by the ideas of certain Japanese liberals. The MacArthur draft did not attempt to impose a United States-style presidential or federal system. Instead, the proposed constitution conformed to the British model of parliamentary government, which was seen by the liberals as the most viable alternative to the European absolutism of the Meiji Constitution.

After 1952, conservatives and nationalists attempted to revise the constitution to make it more "Japanese", but these attempts were frustrated for a number of reasons. One was the extreme difficulty of amending it. Amendments require approval by two-thirds of the members of both houses of the National Diet before they can be presented to the people in a referendum (Article 96). Also, opposition parties, occupying more than one-third of the Diet seats, were firm supporters of the constitutional status quo. Even for members of the ruling Liberal Democratic Party (LDP), the constitution was advantageous. They had been able to fashion a policy-making process congenial to their interests within its framework. Yasuhiro Nakasone, a strong advocate of constitutional revision during much of his political career, for example, downplayed the issue while serving as prime minister between 1982 and 1987.

Provisions 
The constitution has a length of approximately 5,000 words and consists of a preamble and 103 articles grouped into 11 chapters. These are:

 I. The Emperor (Articles 1–8)
 II. Renunciation of War (Article 9)
 III. Rights and Duties of the People (Articles 10–40)
 IV. The Diet (Articles 41–64)
 V. The Cabinet (Articles 65–75)
 VI. Judiciary (Articles 76–82)
 VII. Finance (Articles 83–91)
 VIII. Local Self–Government (Articles 92–95)
 IX. Amendments (Article 96)
 X. Supreme Law (Articles 97–99)
 XI. Supplementary Provisions (Articles 100–103)

Edict 

The constitution starts with an imperial edict made by the Emperor. It contains the Emperor's Privy Seal and signature, and is countersigned by the Prime Minister and other Ministers of State as required by the previous constitution of the Empire of Japan. The edict states:

I rejoice that the foundation for the construction of a new Japan has been laid according to the will of the Japanese people, and hereby sanction and promulgate the amendments of the Imperial Japanese Constitution effected following the consultation with the Privy Council and the decision of the Imperial Diet made in accordance with Article 73 of the said Constitution.

Preamble 
The constitution contains a firm declaration of the principle of popular sovereignty in the preamble. This is proclaimed in the name of the "Japanese people" and declares that "sovereign power resides with the people" and that:

Government is a sacred trust of the people, the authority for which is derived from the people, the powers of which are exercised by the representatives of the people, and the benefits of which are enjoyed by the people.

Part of the purpose of this language is to refute the previous constitutional theory that sovereignty resided in the Emperor. The constitution asserts that the Emperor is merely a symbol of the state, and that he derives "his position from the will of the people with whom resides sovereign power" (Article 1). The text of the constitution also asserts the liberal doctrine of fundamental human rights. In particular Article 97 states that:

the fundamental human rights by this Constitution guaranteed to the people of Japan are fruits of the age-old struggle of man to be free; they have survived the many exacting tests for durability and are conferred upon this and future generations in trust, to be held for all time inviolate.

The Emperor (Articles 1–8) 

Under the constitution, the Emperor is "the symbol of the State and of the unity of the people". Sovereignty rests with the people, not the Emperor as it did under the Meiji Constitution. The Emperor carries out most functions of a head of state, formally appointing the Prime Minister and Chief Justice of the Supreme Court, convoking the National Diet and dissolving the House of Representatives, and also promulgating statutes and treaties and exercising other enumerated functions. However, he acts under the advice and approval of the Cabinet or the Diet.

In contrast with the Meiji Constitution, the Emperor's role is entirely ceremonial, as he does not have powers related to government. Unlike other constitutional monarchies, he is not even the nominal chief executive or even the nominal commander-in-chief of the Japan Self-Defense Forces (JSDF). The constitution explicitly limits the Emperor's role to matters of state delineated in the constitution. The constitution also states that these duties can be delegated by the Emperor as provided for by law.

Succession to the Chrysanthemum Throne is regulated by the Imperial Household Law and is managed by a ten-member body called the Imperial Household Council. The budget for the maintenance of the Imperial House is managed by resolutions of the Diet.

Renunciation of war (Article 9) 

Under Article 9, "the Japanese people forever renounce war as a sovereign right of the nation and the threat or use of force as means of settling international disputes". To this end, the article provides that "land, sea, and air forces, as well as another war potential, will never be maintained". The necessity and practical extent of Article 9 have been debated in Japan since its enactment, particularly following the establishment of the Japan Self-Defence Forces (JSDF), a de facto post-war Japanese military force that substitutes for the pre-war Armed Forces, since 1 July 1954. Some lower courts have found the JSDF unconstitutional, but the Supreme Court never ruled on this issue.

Individuals have also challenged the presence of U.S. forces in Japan as well as the U.S.-Japan Security Treaty under Article 9 of the Constitution. The Supreme Court of Japan has found that the stationing of U.S. forces did not violate Article 9, because it did not involve forces under Japanese command. The Court ruled the U.S.-Japan Security Treaty to be a highly sensitive political question, and declined to rule on its legality under the political question doctrine.

Various political groups have called for either revising or abolishing the restrictions of Article 9 to permit collective defense efforts and strengthen Japan's military capabilities.

The United States has pressured Japan to amend Article 9 and to rearm as early as 1948 with Japan gradually expanding its military capabilities, "sidestepping constitutional constraints".

Individual rights (Articles 10–40) 

"The rights and duties of the people" are featured prominently in the post-war constitution. Thirty-one of its 103 articles are devoted to describing them in detail, reflecting the commitment to "respect for the fundamental human rights" of the Potsdam Declaration. Although the Meiji Constitution had a section devoted to the "rights and duties of subjects" which guaranteed "liberty of speech, writing, publication, public meetings, and associations", these rights were granted "within the limits of law" and could be limited by legislation. Freedom of religious belief was allowed "insofar as it does not interfere with the duties of subjects" (all Japanese were required to acknowledge the Emperor's divinity, and those, such as Christians, who refused to do so out of religious conviction were accused of lèse-majesté). Such freedoms are delineated in the post-war constitution without qualification.

Individual rights under the Japanese constitution are rooted in Article 13 where the constitution asserts the right of the people "to be respected as individuals" and, subject to "the public welfare", to "life, liberty, and the pursuit of happiness". This article's core notion is jinkaku, which represents "the elements of character and personality that come together to define each person as an individual", and which represents the aspects of each individual's life that the government is obligated to respect in the exercise of its power. Article 13 has been used as the basis to establish constitutional rights to privacy, self-determination and the control of an individual's own image, rights which are not explicitly stated in the constitution.

Subsequent provisions provide for:

 Equality before the law: The constitution guarantees equality before the law and outlaws discrimination against Japanese citizens based on "political, economic or social relations" or "race, creed, sex, social status or family origin" (Article 14). The right to vote cannot be denied on the grounds of "race, creed, sex, social status, family origin, education, property or income" (Article 44). Equality between the sexes is explicitly guaranteed in relation to marriage (Article 24) and childhood education (Article 26).
 Prohibition of peerage: Article 14 forbids the state from recognising peerage. Honors may be conferred but they must not be hereditary or grant special privileges.
 Democratic elections: Article 15 provides that "the people have the inalienable right to choose their public officials and to dismiss them". It guarantees universal adult (in Japan, persons age 20 and older) suffrage and the secret ballot.
 Prohibition of slavery: Guaranteed by Article 18. Involuntary servitude is permitted only as punishment for a crime.
 Separation of Religion and State: The state is prohibited from granting privileges or political authority to a religion, or conducting religious education (Article 20).
 Freedom of assembly, association, speech, and secrecy of communications: All guaranteed without qualification by Article 21, which forbids censorship.
 Workers' rights: Work is declared both a right and obligation by Article 27 which also states that "standards for wages, hours, rest and other working conditions shall be fixed by law" and that children shall not be exploited. Workers have the right to participate in a trade union (Article 28).
 Right to property: Guaranteed subject to the "public welfare". The state may take property for public use if it pays just compensation (Article 29). The state also has the right to levy taxes (Article 30).
 Right to due process: Article 31 provides that no one may be punished "except according to procedure established by law". Article 32, which provides that "No person shall be denied the right of access to the courts", originally drafted to recognize criminal due process rights, is now also understood as the source of due process rights for civil and administrative law cases.
 Protection against unlawful detention: Article 33 provides that no one may be apprehended without an arrest warrant, save where caught in flagrante delicto. Article 34 guarantees habeas corpus, right to counsel, and right to be informed of charges. Article 40 enshrines the right to sue the state for wrongful detention.
 Right to a fair trial: Article 37 guarantees the right to a public trial before an impartial tribunal with counsel for one's defence and compulsory access to witnesses.
 Protection against self-incrimination: Article 38 provides that no one may be compelled to testify against themselves, that confessions obtained under duress are not admissible, and that no one may be convicted solely on the basis of their own confession.
 Other guarantees:
 Right to petition government (Article 16)
 Right to sue the state (Article 17)
 Freedom of thought and conscience (Article 19)
 Freedom of expression (Article 19)
 Freedom of religion (Article 20)
 Rights to change residence, choose employment, move abroad and relinquish nationality (Article 22)
 Academic freedom (Article 23)
 Prohibition of forced marriage (Article 24)
 Compulsory education (Article 26)
 Protection against entries, search and seizures (Article 35)
 Prohibition of torture and cruel punishments (Article 36)
 Prohibition of ex post facto laws (Article 39)
 Prohibition of double jeopardy (Article 39)

Under Japanese case law, constitutional human rights apply to corporations to the extent possible given their corporate nature. Constitutional human rights also apply to foreign nationals to the extent that such rights are not by their nature only applicable to citizens (for example, foreigners have no right to enter Japan under Article 22 and no right to vote under Article 15, and their other political rights may be restricted to the extent that they interfere with the state's decision making).

Organs of government (Articles 41–95) 

The constitution establishes a parliamentary system of government in which legislative authority is vested in a bicameral National Diet. Although a bicameral Diet existed under the existing constitution, the new constitution abolished the upper House of Peers, which consisted of members of the nobility (similar to the British House of Lords). The new constitution provides that both chambers be directly elected, with a lower House of Representatives and an upper House of Councillors.

The Diet nominates the Prime Minister from among its members, although the Lower House has the final authority if the two Houses disagree. Thus, in practice, the Prime Minister is the leader of the majority party of the Lower House. The House of Representatives has the sole ability to pass a vote of no confidence in the Cabinet, can override the House of Councillors' veto on any bill, and has priority in determining the national budget, and approving treaties.

Executive authority is vested in a cabinet, jointly responsible to the Diet, and headed by a Prime Minister. The prime minister and a majority of the cabinet members must be members of the Diet, and have the right and obligation to attend sessions of the Diet. The Cabinet may also advise the Emperor to dissolve the House of Representatives and call for a general election to be held.

The judiciary consists of several lower courts headed by a Supreme Court. The Chief Justice of the Supreme Court is nominated by the Cabinet and appointed by the Emperor, while other justices are nominated and appointed by the Cabinet and attested by the Emperor. Lower court judges are nominated by the Supreme Court, appointed by the Cabinet and attested by the Emperor. All courts have the power of judicial review and may interpret the constitution to overrule statutes and other government acts, but only in the event that such interpretation is relevant to an actual dispute.

The constitution also provides a framework for local government, requiring that local entities have elected heads and assemblies, and providing that government acts applicable to particular local areas must be approved by the residents of those areas. These provisions formed the framework of the Local Autonomy Law of 1947, which established the modern system of prefectures, municipalities and other local government entities.

Amendments (Article 96) 

Under Article 96, amendments to the constitution "shall be initiated by the Diet, through a concurring vote of two-thirds or more of all the members of each House and shall thereupon be submitted to the people for ratification, which shall require the affirmative vote of a majority of all votes cast thereon, at a special referendum or at such election as the Diet shall specify". The constitution has not been amended since its implementation in 1947, although there have been movements led by the Liberal Democratic Party to make various amendments to it.

Other provisions (Articles 97–103) 
Article 97 provides for the inviolability of fundamental human rights. Article 98 provides that the constitution takes precedence over any "law, ordinance, imperial rescript or other act of government" that offends against its provisions, and that "the treaties concluded by Japan and established laws of nations shall be faithfully observed". In most nations it is for the legislature to determine to what extent, if at all, treaties concluded by the state will be reflected in its domestic law; under Article 98, however, international law and the treaties Japan has ratified automatically form a part of domestic law. Article 99 binds the Emperor and public officials to observe the constitution.

The final four articles set forth a six-month transitional period between adoption and implementation of the Constitution. This transitional period took place from 3 November 1946, to 3 May 1947. Pursuant to Article 100, the first House of Councillors election was held during this period in April 1947, and pursuant to Article 102, half of the elected Councillors were given three-year terms. A general election was also held during this period, as a result of which several former House of Peers members moved to the House of Representatives. Article 103 provided that public officials currently in office would not be removed as a direct result of the adoption or implementation of the new Constitution.

Amendments and revisions

Process 
Article 96 provides that amendments can be made to the Constitution if approved by super majority of two-thirds of both houses of the Diet, and then by a simple majority in a popular referendum. The Emperor promulgates the successful amendment in the name of the people, and cannot veto it.

Unlike some constitutions (e.g. the German, Italian, and French Constitutions), Japan's Constitution does not have an explicit entrenchment provision limiting what can be amended. However, the Preamble of the Constitution declared democracy to be the "universal principle of mankind" and Article 97 proclaims the fundamental rights guaranteed by the Constitution to be "for all time inviolable." Because of this, scholars generally believe that basic principles such as the sovereignty of the people, pacifism, and respect for human rights are unamendable. More broadly, fundamental norms written in the Constitution by constituent power cannot be amended. The preamble of the Constitution states: "We reject and revoke all constitutions, laws, ordinances, and rescripts in conflict herewith". Pacifism, popular sovereignty and respect for basic human rights are among them according to the Preamble and Article 11.

History 
The Constitution has not been amended since its enactment in 1946. Some commentators have suggested that the Constitution's American authors favoured the difficulty of the amendment process from a desire that the fundamentals of the regime they had imposed would be resistant to change. Among the Japanese themselves, any change to the document and to the post-war settlement it embodies is highly controversial. From the 1960s to the 1980s, Constitutional revision was rarely debated, although amendment of the Constitution has been one of the party line of the LDP since it was formed. In the 1990s, right-leaning and conservative voices broke some taboos, for example, when the newspaper Yomiuri Shimbun published a suggestion for Constitutional revision in 1994. This period saw a number of right-leaning groups pushing aggressively for Constitutional revision and a significant number of organizations and individuals speaking out against revision and in support of "the peace Constitution".

The debate has been highly polarised. The most controversial issues are proposed changes to Article 9—the "peace article"—and provisions relating to the role of the Emperor. Progressive, left, centre-left and peace movement-related individuals and organizations, as well as the opposition parties, labor and youth groups advocate keeping or strengthening the existing Constitution in these areas, while right-leaning, nationalist and conservative groups and individuals advocate changes to increase the prestige of the Emperor (though not granting him political powers) and to allow a more aggressive stance of the JSDF by turning it officially into a military. Other areas of the Constitution and connected laws discussed for potential revision related to the status of women, the education system and the system of public corporations (including social welfare, non-profit and religious organizations as well as foundations), and structural reform of the election process, e.g. to allow for direct election of the prime minister. Numerous grassroots groups, associations, NGOs, think tanks, scholars, and politicians speak out on either side of the issue.

Amendment Drafts by the LDP 
The Liberal Democratic Party (LDP), one of the most influential political parties in Japan that has been in majority in the Diet for most of the time since its 1955 establishment, has adopted several party platforms each of which lists "revision of the current constitution" as a political motive. One of the earliest platforms, "The Duties of the Party" in 1955, points out as follows:

In recent years the LDP has committed itself more to constitutional revision, following its victory in the September 2005 general election of the representatives. Currently, the party has released two versions of amendment drafts, one in 2005 and another in 2012.

2005 Draft 
In August 2005, the then Japanese Prime Minister, Jun'ichirō Koizumi, proposed an amendment to the constitution to increase Japan's Defence Forces' roles in international affairs. A draft of the proposed constitution was released by the LDP on 22 November 2005 as part of the fiftieth anniversary of the party's founding. The proposed changes included:

 New wording for the Preamble.
 First paragraph of Article 9, renouncing war, is retained. The second paragraph, forbidding the maintenance of "land, sea, and air forces, as well as another war potential" is replaced by an Article 9-2 which permits a "defense force", under the control of the Prime Minister, to defend the nation and which may participate in international activities. This new section uses the term "軍" (gun, "army" or "military"), which has been avoided in the current constitution. It also adds Article 76 about military courts; members of the JSDF are currently tried as civilians by civilian courts.
 Modified wording in Article 13, regarding respect for individual rights.
 Changes in Article 20, which gives the state limited permission within "the scope of socially acceptable protocol" for "ethnocultural practices". Changes Article 89 to permit corresponding state funding of religious institutions.
 Changes to Articles 92 and 95, concerning local self-government and relations between local and national governments.
 Changes to Article 96, reducing the vote requirement for constitutional amendments in the Diet from two-thirds to a simple majority. A national referendum would still be required.

This draft prompted debate, with strong opposition coming even from non-governmental organizations of other countries, as well as established and newly formed grassroots Japanese organizations, such as Save Article 9. Per the current constitution, a proposal for constitutional changes must be passed by a two-thirds vote in the Diet, then be put to a national referendum. However, there was in 2005 no legislation in place for such a referendum.

Koizumi's successor Shinzō Abe vowed to push aggressively for Constitutional revision. A major step toward this was getting legislation passed to allow for a national referendum in April 2007. By that time there was little public support for changing the Constitution, with a survey showing 34.5% of Japanese not wanting any changes, 44.5% wanting no changes to Article 9, and 54.6% supporting the current interpretation on self-defense. On the 60th anniversary of the Constitution, on 3 May 2007, thousands took to the streets in support of Article 9. The Chief Cabinet secretary and other top government officials interpreted the survey to mean that the public wanted a pacifist Constitution that renounces war, and may need to be better informed about the details of the revision debate. The legislation passed by parliament specifies that a referendum on Constitutional reform could take place at the earliest in 2010, and would need approval from a majority of voters.

2012 Draft 

On 27 April 2012, the LDP drafted a new version of amendment with an explanatory booklet for general readers. The booklet states that the spirit of the amendment is to "make the Constitution more suitable for Japan" by "drastically revising the translationese wording and the provisions based on the theory of natural human rights currently adopted in the Constitution". The proposed changes includes:

 Preamble: In the LDP draft, the Preamble declares that Japan is reigned by the Emperor and adopts the popular sovereignty and trias politica principles. The current Preamble refers to the government as a trust of the people (implying the "natural rights codified into the constitution by the social contract" model) and ensures people "the right to live in peace, free from fear and want", but both mentions are deleted in the LDP draft.
 Emperor: Overall, the LDP draft adopts a wording that sounds as though the Emperor has greater power than under the current Constitution. The draft defines him as "the head of the State" (Article 1). Compared to the current Constitution, he is exempted from "the obligation to respect and uphold this Constitution" (Article 102). The draft defines Nisshōki as the national flag and Kimigayo the national anthem (Article 3).
 Human rights: The LDP draft, as the accompanying booklet states, revises many of the human rights provisions currently adopted in the Constitution. The booklet describes the reason for these changes as: "Human rights should have ground on the State's history, culture and tradition" and "Several of the current Constitutional provisions are based on the Western-European theory of natural human rights; such provisions, therefore, require to be changed." The draft lists every instance of the basic rights as something that is entitled by the State as opposed to something that human beings inherently possess as seen in the draft provisions of "new human rights" (see below).

The current Constitution has the phrase "public welfare" in four articles (Articles 12, 13, 22 and 29) and states that any human right is subject to restriction when it "interferes with the public welfare". The majority of legal professionals argue that the spirit of such restriction against rights based on "public welfare" is to protect other people's rights from infringement. In the LDP draft, every instance of the phrase "public welfare" is replaced with a new phrase: "public interest and public order". The booklet describes the reason for this change as "to enable the State to restrict human rights for the sake of purposes other than protecting people's rights from infringement", but it remains unclear under what conditions the State can restrict human rights. It also explains that what "public order" means is "order of society" and its intention is not to prohibit the people from making an objection to the government, but it explains nothing about "public interest".

Provisions regarding the people's rights modified or added in the LDP draft include:

 [Individualism]: The LDP draft replaces the word "individuals" with "persons" (Article 13). This change reflects the draft authors' view that "excessive individualism" is an ethically unacceptable thought.
 Human rights and the supremacy of the constitution: The current constitution has Article 97 at the beginning of the "Supreme Law" chapter, which stipulates that the constitution guarantees basic human rights to the people. The current, prevalent interpretation of Article 97 is that this article describes the essential reason why this constitution is the supreme law, which is the fact that the constitution's spirit is to guarantee human rights. In the LDP draft, this article is deleted and the booklet does not explain any reason for the deletion.
 Freedom of assembly, association, speech and all other forms of expression: The LDP draft adds a new paragraph on Article 21, which enables the State to prohibit the people from performing expressions "for the purpose of interfering with public interest and public order". The LDP explains that this change makes it easy for the State to take countermeasures against criminal organizations like Aum Shinrikyo.
 Right to property: The LDP draft adds a new paragraph stating that the State shall define intellectual property rights "for the sake of promotion of the people's intellectual creativity" (Article 29).
 Workers' rights: Workers have the right to participate in a labor union, but currently there is a dispute on whether public officials should be entitled to this right. The LDP draft adds a new paragraph to make it clear that public officials shall not enjoy this right or part thereof (Article 28).
 Freedom from torture and cruel punishments: Under the current constitution, torture and cruel punishments are "absolutely forbidden", but the LDP draft deletes the word "absolutely" (Article 36). The reason for this change is not presented in the booklet.
 "New human rights": The LDP draft adds four provisions regarding the concept collectively called "new human rights": protection of privacy (Article 19–2), accountability of the State (Article 21–2), environmental protection (Article 25–2), and rights of crime victims (Article 25–4). However, the draft only requires the State to make a good faith effort to meet the stated goals and does not entitle the people to these "rights", as the booklet points out.
 Obligations of the people: The LDP draft can be characterized by its obligation clauses imposed on the people. The current constitution lists three obligations: to work (Article 27), to pay taxes as provided for by law (Article 30), and to have all boys and girls under their protection receive ordinary education as provided for by law (Article 26). The LDP draft adds six more:
 The people must respect the national anthem and flag (Article 3).
 The people must be conscious of the fact that there are responsibilities and obligations in compensation for freedom and rights (Article 12).
 The people must comply with the public interest and public order (Article 12).
 The people must help one another among the members of a household (Article 24).
 The people must obey commands from the State or the subordinate offices thereof in a state of emergency (Article 99).
 The people must uphold the constitution (Article 102).

Additionally, although defence of the national territory (Article 9–3) and environmental protection (Article 25–2) are literally listed under the LDP draft as obligations of the State, these provisions let the State call for the "cooperation with the people" to meet the goals provided, effectively functioning as obligation clauses on the people's side.

 Equality: The current constitution guarantees equality to citizens, prohibiting any discrimination based on "race, creed, sex, social status or family origin". The LDP draft adds "handicaps" (Articles 14 and 44) between "sex" and "social status", improving the equality under the law. On the other hand, the sentence "No privilege shall accompany any award of honor, decoration or any distinction" in the current paragraph (2) of Article 14 is deleted in the LDP draft, which means that the State shall be allowed to grant "privilege" as part of national awards. The reason for this change is not presented in the booklet.
 National security: The LDP draft deletes the current provision declaring that armed forces and another war potential shall never be maintained, and adds new Articles 9-2 and 9-3 stating that the "National Defense Force" shall be set up and the Prime Minister shall be its commander-in-chief. According to the paragraph (3) of the new Article 9–2, the National Defense Force not only can defend the territory from a foreign attack and can participate in international peacekeeping operations, but also can operate to either maintain domestic public order or to protect individual rights.
 State of emergency: The LDP draft grants the Prime Minister the authority to declare a "state of emergency" in a national emergency including foreign invasions, domestic rebellions, and natural disasters (Article 98). When in a state of emergency, the Cabinet can enact orders that have the effect of the laws passed by the [National Diet] (Article 99).
 Relaxation of separation of religion and the State: The LDP draft deletes the current clause that prohibits the State from granting "political authority" to a religious organization, and enables the State to perform religious acts itself within the scope of "social protocol or ethnocultural practices" (Article 20).
 Political control over the courts: Unlike the current constitution, which guarantees that the Supreme court judges shall not be dismissed unless the "review" procedure stipulated by the constitution, the LDP draft enables the Diet to define this review procedure through a Diet-enacted law, not the constitution (Article 79). The draft also states that the salary of a judge of both the Supreme Court and inferior courts could be decreased in the same manner as any other kind of public official(s) (Articles 79 and 80) by the subordinate offices of the State (namely, the National Personnel Authority).
 Further amendments: The LDP draft states that a simple majority in the two Houses shall be adequate for a motion for a constitutional amendment (Article 96). An actual amendment shall still require a national referendum, but a simple majority in "the number of valid votes actually cast", as opposed to "the number of qualified voters" or "the number of votes", shall enact the amendment (Article 96).

2014 Reinterpretation 
On 1 July 2014, a Cabinet meeting issued a decision on Article 9, reinterpreting the Constitution and approving collective defense operations by the JSDF. This decision was challenged as a violation of the Constitution by Japanese Federation of Bar Associations. Historically, the government has maintained that Article 9 forbids the right to collective defence.

See also

Former constitutions 
 Seventeen-article constitution (604) - rather a document of moral teachings, not a constitution in the modern meaning.
 Meiji Constitution (1889)

Others 
 Article 9 of the Japanese Constitution
 Article 96 of the Japanese Constitution
 Basic Law for the Federal Republic of Germany
 Constitution Memorial Day
 Constitution of Italy
 History of Japan
 Politics of Japan
 Proposed Japanese constitutional referendum

Notes

References 
 The Constitution of Japan Project 2004. Rethinking the Constitution: An Anthology of Japanese Opinion. Trans. by F. Uleman. Kawasaki, Japan: Japan Research Inc., 2008. .
 
 Kishimoto, Koichi. Politics in Modern Japan. Tokyo: Japan Echo, 1988. . Pages 7–21.
 Matsui, Shigenori. The Constitution of Japan:  A Contextual Analysis.  Oxford: Hart Publishing, 2011.  .

External links 

 Full text of Constitution from the Cabinet

 
 Birth of the Constitution of Japan
 Teruki Tsunemoto, Trends in Japanese Constitutional Law Cases: Important Judicial Decisions for 2004, trans. Daryl Takeno, Asian-Pacific Law & Policy Journal
 Teruki Tsunemoto, Trends in Japanese Constitutional Law Cases: Important Legal Precedents for 2005, trans. John Donovan, Yuko Funaki, and Jennifer Shimada, Asian-Pacific Law & Policy Journal
 Teruki Tsunemoto, Trends in Japanese Constitutional Law Cases: Important Legal Precedents for 2006, trans. Asami Miyazawa and Angela Thompson, Asian-Pacific Law & Policy Journal
 Teruki Tsunemoto, Trends in Japanese Constitutional Law Cases: Important Legal Precedents for 2007, trans. Mark A. Levin and Jesse Smith, Asian-Pacific Law & Policy Journal
 Library of Congress Country Study on Japan
  Beate Sirota Gordon (Blog about Beate Sirota Gordon and the documentary film "The Gift from Beate")
 Reischauer Institute of Japanese Studies at Harvard University
  Shin Kenpou Sou-an, Draft New Constitution. As released by the Liberal Democratic Party on 22 November 2005.
  Web page of the Shin Kenpou Seitei Suishin Honbu, Center to Promote Enactment of a New Constitution, of the Liberal Democratic Party.
  Nihon-koku Kenpou Kaisei Souan, Amendment Draft of the Constitution of Japan. As released by the Liberal Democratic Party on 27 April 2012.
  Nihon-koku Kenpou Kaisei Souan Q & A. As released by the Liberal Democratic Party in October 2012.

Government of Japan
Politics of Post-war Japan
1947 in law
Cold War treaties
Constitutions of Japan
1947 documents
May 1947 events in Asia
1947 in politics